Cat Island is a Wisconsin island in Lake Superior. It is one of the Apostle Islands and a part of the Apostle Islands National Lakeshore. Variant names include Caterhemlock Island and Kagagiwanijikag Miniss. According to USGS GNIS, there is a smaller Cat Island in Brown County, Wisconsin just off shore of the city of Green Bay..

Cat Island has gone by a number of names including Kagagiwanjikag Miniss (Ojibwe for "Island of Hemlock Trees"), Texas Island, Hemlock Island and Shoe Island.

Notes

Apostle Islands
Islands of Ashland County, Wisconsin